Sandy Creek is a station on the Port Authority of Allegheny County's light rail network, located in Bethel Park, Pennsylvania. The street level stop was added to the route to serve the nearby Sandy Creek Apartment complex, for which the stop was named. However, the only pedestrian access that remains is from the Timberidge apartment complex on the opposite side of the line. A variety of townhouses and condominiums have been located near the stop, as part of a transit village model designed to encourage public transit as the primary form of transportation for residents.

Sandy Creek was originally one of 13 stops along the Port Authority Light Rail lines to be discontinued on June 25, 2012, in an effort to shorten commute times.   However, Port Authority officials found the 1/2 mile walk from this stop to the next nearest stop (West Library) unsafe as it required going down a steep hill and crossing Library Road (Route 88).  As a result, the Sandy Creek stop remains open.

References

Port Authority of Allegheny County stations
Railway stations in the United States opened in 1987
Silver Line (Pittsburgh)